The 1995–96 Primera División de Fútbol Profesional season is the 44th tournament of El Salvador's Primera División since its establishment of the National League system in 1948. The tournament began on 3 September 1995 and it was scheduled to end on May 26, 1996. FAS won the replay championship match against LA Firpo 1–0. After the first game was tied 1-1.

Teams

Managerial changes

Before the season

During the season

Semifinals

First legs

Second legs 

LA Firpo won 3-2 on aggregate

Firpo won 3-2 on aggregate

Final

Top scorers

List of foreign players in the league
This is a list of foreign players in 1995-1996. The following players:
have played at least one  game for the respective club.
have not been capped for the El Salvador national football team on any level, independently from the birthplace

C.D. Águila
  Luis Mariano Villegas
  Octavio Santana
  José Luis Piota
  Victor Zuniga
  Kit Fletcher
  Agustin Castillo

Alianza F.C.
  Martin Jiminez
  Alejandro Curbelo
  Charles Unaka
  Hernan Fernando Sosa

Atletico Marte
  Gerson Enoc Voss
  Abdul Conteh
  Alejandro Larrea
  Raúl Falero
  Washington de la Cruz

Baygon-ADET
  Fernando de Souza

Dragon
  Miguel Segura
  Luis Areola
  Carlos Ruiz
  Carlos Villareal

 (player released mid season)
  (player Injured mid season)
 Injury replacement player

El Roble
  German Perez
  Jorge Olgades
  William Couto Gutierrez
  Fernando Olivera

C.D. FAS
  Ariel Borldrini   
  Allan Oviedo
  Julio Rodas
  Carlos Sanchez  
  Diego Aguirre
  Jorge Moccecci
  David Quezada

C.D. Luis Ángel Firpo
  Mauricio Do Santos
  Raul Toro
  Floyd Guthrie
  Luis Enrique Oseguera 
  Lester Clay Marson

Limeno
   Cristian Vactory
  German Rodriguez
  Jorge Martinez
  Rainiero Medina
  Ivan Nolasco

Tiburones
  Juan Marrquez
  Carl Davis
  Javier Flores

External links
 
 
 

1996